TUI fly Netherlands, legally incorporated as TUI Airlines Netherlands (formerly branded as Arkefly and Arke), is a Dutch charter airline headquartered in Schiphol-Rijk on the grounds of Amsterdam Airport Schiphol in Haarlemmermeer, Netherlands. It is the charter carrier of the Dutch arm of the German travel conglomerate TUI Group and its main base is Schiphol Airport.

History

TUI fly Netherlands traces its roots to Air Holland which was founded in 1981. After financial problems, Air Holland was taken over by the ExelAviation Group and took a new start as HollandExel in January 2004. In May 2005, the ExelAviation Group was declared bankrupt. The German TUI Group took over the airline's activities and renamed it ArkeFly.

Operations in Curaçao began on 15 July 2004 as DutchCaribbeanExel, which was also part of the ExelAviation Group but was later taken over, together with sister airline HollandExel, by the TUI Group and renamed ArkeFly Curaçao. ArkeFly started weekly flights to St. Maarten from Amsterdam on 2 December 2007 but discontinued this service in November 2008. TUI holds that flights may resume if the volume of tourists travelling to St. Maarten increases. Operations to Orlando, Miami, Puerto Vallarta, and Israel began in 2011.

In October 2013, Arkefly changed its marketing name to Arke, to reflect the partnership with the travel agency of the same name.

On 13 May 2015, it was announced by the TUI Group that all five of TUI's airline subsidiaries will be named TUI, whilst keeping their separate air operator's certificate, taking over three years to complete. Arke was the first to undergo the change and was renamed TUI on 1 October 2015, therefore changing the airline's name also.

Destinations

TUI fly Netherlands carries out regular and chartered flights, although most of the chartered flights are operated for the Dutch tour operator TUI Netherlands. It operates to destinations in the Mediterranean, Finland, Canary Islands, Red Sea, Mexico, Caribbean, United States, Africa, Middle East and the Dutch Caribbean.

Codeshare agreements
Additionally, TUI fly Netherlands used to have a codeshare agreement with Surinam Airways.

Fleet

Current fleet
As of November 2022, the TUI fly Netherlands fleet consists of the following aircraft:

Fleet modernization
TUI Group has 70 737 MAXs on order for the group, the order consists of a mix of the 737 MAX 8 and MAX 10 and some of these will be used for the airline to modernize the fleet and replace older aircraft. The number of aircraft allocated to TUI fly Netherlands is yet unknown with deliveries of the new aircraft commencing in January 2018.

Former fleet

TUI fly Netherlands formerly operated the following aircraft:

See also
List of airlines of the Netherlands

References

External links

Official website

Airlines of the Netherlands
Airlines of the Netherlands Antilles
Charter airlines
Airlines established in 2005
Dutch companies established in 2005
TUI Group
Companies based in North Holland
Haarlemmermeer